Ashley John Harvey-Walker (21 July 1944 – 28 April 1997) was an English cricketer who played first-class cricket for Derbyshire from 1971 to 1978.  He was shot dead in a Johannesburg bar.

Hundred on debut
Harvey-Walker was born in East Ham, London and educated at Strathallan School in Perthshire, where he was in the first XI for five years.   After school he joined Warwickshire in 1963 and played for the second XI team.  He moved to Derbyshire in 1967 where he also played in the second XI.  In the 1971 season he made his first team debut.  He became the first Derbyshire cricketer to score a century on his debut scoring an unbeaten 110 against Oxford University at Burton-on-Trent.

Career
Harvey-Walker was a right-handed batsman and a right-arm off-break and medium-pace bowler.  Early in his career he played purely as a top order batsman, though he struggled to hold down a regular place in a weak batting side.  His best season was in 1974 when he scored 727 runs at 25.96, and also scored 448 List 'A' runs.

In June 1975, during a match between Derbyshire and Lancashire at Buxton, a highly unseasonal snowstorm took place.  To that date, it was the only first-class cricket match in history whereby, 'snow stopped play', in what was one of the hottest summers on record.  Shortly after the thaw set in, Harvey-Walker came out to bat and surprised square leg umpire Dickie Bird by asking him to look after his false teeth, wrapped in a handkerchief, because he wouldn't be in for long!

Not regarded as a regular bowler much beforehand, he was regularly employed when selected in the 1978 season, taking 10–82, including 7–35 in the second innings against Surrey on the notoriously uncertain wicket at Ilkeston. Despite playing in the 1978 Benson & Hedges Cup Final he was not re-engaged at the end of the season in a general clearout by the County.

Following his release from Derbyshire, he played for Undercliffe Cricket Club in the Bradford Cricket League and then emigrated to South Africa.  He was working as assistant groundsman at the Wanderers Stadium in Johnannesburg, and only a month before his death had helped to prepare the pitch for the Test against Australia.

Death
On 28 April 1997, at the age of 52, Harvey-Walker was shot dead at a private club in the Berea neighbourhood of Johannesburg.  Apparently, a gunman walked into the bar, called out Harvey-Walker's name, and shot him when he responded.

See also
 List of cricketers who were murdered

References

1944 births
1997 deaths
English cricketers
Derbyshire cricketers
Warwickshire cricketers
People educated at Strathallan School
Male murder victims
English people murdered abroad
People murdered in Johannesburg
Deaths by firearm in South Africa
1997 murders in South Africa